This is a list of newspapers in the U.S. state of Oregon. The list is divided between papers currently being produced and those produced in the past and subsequently terminated.

Daily newspapers 
Albany Democrat-Herald – Albany
 The Daily Astorian – Astoria
 The Bulletin – Bend
 Corvallis Gazette-Times – Corvallis
 The Register-Guard – Eugene
 Grants Pass Daily Courier – Grants Pass
 Herald and News – Klamath Falls
 The News Guard – Lincoln City
 Argus Observer – Ontario
 East Oregonian – Pendleton
 The Oregonian – Portland
 The News-Review – Roseburg
 Statesman Journal – Salem
 The Dalles Chronicle – The Dalles

Weekly, semi-weekly and monthly newspapers 
 Baker City Herald – Baker City
 Beaverton Valley Times – Beaverton
 Cascade Business News – Bend
 Curry Coastal Pilot – Brookings
 The Times – Brownsville
 Burns Times-Herald – Burns
 Canby Herald – Canby
 Cannon Beach Gazette – Cannon Beach
 Illinois Valley News – Cave Junction
 The Clatskanie Chief – Clatskanie
 The Times-Journal – Condon
 The World – Coos Bay
 The Coquille Valley Sentinel – Coquille
 Cottage Grove Sentinel – Cottage Grove
 Creswell Chronicle – Creswell
 Polk County Itemizer-Observer – Dallas
 The Drain Enterprise – Drain
 Wallowa County Chieftain – Enterprise
 Estacada News – Estacada
 Siuslaw News – Florence
 News-Times – Forest Grove
 Curry County Reporter – Gold Beach
 Smoke Signals – Grand Ronde
 The Outlook – Gresham
 Hells Canyon Journal – Halfway
 Heppner Gazette-Times – Heppner
 Hillsboro Tribune – Hillsboro
 Hood River News – Hood River
 Blue Mountain Eagle – John Day
 The Tribune News – Junction City
 Keizertimes – Keizer
 King City Regal Courier – King City
 The Observer – La Grande
 Lake Oswego Review – Lake Oswego
 Lake County Examiner – Lakeview
 The Madras Pioneer – Madras
 The North Coast Citizen – Manzanita
 McKenzie River Reflections – McKenzie Bridge
 The News-Register – McMinnville
 Rogue Valley Times – Medford
 Valley Herald – Milton-Freewater
 Clackamas Review – Milwaukie
 Molalla Pioneer – Molalla
 The Douglas County Mail – Myrtle Creek
 Myrtle Point Herald – Myrtle Point
 The Newberg Graphic – Newberg
 News-Times – Newport
 Dead Mountain Echo – Oakridge
 Oregon City News – Oregon City
Portland Tribune – Portland
 Port Orford News – Port Orford
 The Asian Reporter – Portland
 The Bee – Portland
 Catholic Sentinel – Portland
 Daily Journal of Commerce – Portland
 The Hollywood Star News – Portland
 Northwest Examiner – Portland
 Northwest Labor Press – Portland
 Portland Business Journal – Portland
 Portland Observer – Portland
 Southwest Community Connection – Portland
 Street Roots – Portland
 Central Oregonian – Prineville
 The Redmond Spokesman – Redmond
 Rogue River Press – Rogue River
 The Chronicle – St. Helens
 Capital Press – Salem
 The Sandy Post – Sandy
 The South County Spotlight – Scappoose
 Scio Tribune – Scio
 Seaside Signal – Seaside
 Sherwood Gazette – Sherwood
 Siletz News – Siletz
 Nugget Newspaper – Sisters
 Douglas County News – Sutherlin
 The New Era – Sweet Home
 The Times – Tigard
 Headlight-Herald – Tillamook
 Confederated Umatilla Journal – Umatilla
 Malheur Enterprise – Vale
 Spilyay Tymoo – Warm Springs
 The Columbia Press – Warrenton
 West Linn Tidings – West Linn
 Wilsonville Spokesman – Wilsonville
 Woodburn Independent – Woodburn

 Alternative newspapers 
 The Source Weekly – Bend
 Eugene Weekly – Eugene
 The Portland Mercury – Portland
 Willamette Week – Portland

 Digital only newspapers 
 Ashland.news – Ashland
 Jewish Review – Portland
 Klamath Falls News – Klamath Falls
 Portland Alliance – Portland
 The Skanner – Portland

 College newspapers The Clackamas Print  – Clackamas Community CollegeConcordia Chronicles – Concordia UniversityHilltop News – Corban UniversityEastern Voice – Eastern Oregon University The Crescent – George Fox University The Torch – Lane Community College The Pioneer Log – Lewis & Clark College The Linfield Review – Linfield UniversityThe Commuter – Linn-Benton Community CollegeThe Advocate – Mt. Hood Community CollegeThe Edge – Oregon Institute of TechnologyThe Daily Barometer – Oregon State UniversityThe Pacific Index – Pacific UniversityDaily Vanguard  – Portland State UniversityThe Quest – Reed College The Siskiyou – Southern Oregon UniversityDaily Emerald  – University of Oregon
The Beacon – University of Portland
The Western Oregon Journal – Western Oregon University
The Collegian – Willamette University

Newspapers no longer in print 

The earliest newspaper in Oregon was the Oregon Spectator, published in Oregon City from 1846, by a press association headed by George Abernethy. This was joined in November 1850 by the Milwaukie Western Star and two partisan papers – the Whig Oregonian, published in Portland beginning on December 4, 1850, and the Democratic Statesman, launched in Oregon City in March 1851. The latter paper would subsequently move to Salem, and it continues today as the Statesman-Journal.

See also
 Lists of Oregon-related topics
 Oregon Newspaper Publishers Association

References

Further reading

External links
 Oregon Newspaper Publishers Association
 . (Survey of local news existence and ownership in 21st century)

Oregon
</noinclude>